Glimpse: Live Recordings from Around the World is Sonicflood's sixth original album and second live album. It was released on October 31, 2006.

Track listing
 "Your Love Goes On Forever" - 4:40
 "Open the Eyes of My Heart" - 4:48
 "You Are" - 4:48
 "I Want to Know You" - 4:34
 "Resonate" - 3:20
 "God Is Here" - 4:21
 "Cry Holy" - 4:38
 "Everlasting" - 4:27
 "Lord of the Dance" - 5:01
 "Infinite Love" - 4:35
 "Save Me" - 3:56
 "In Thailand" - 0:59

Personnel 
Sonicflood
 Rick Heil – lead vocals
 Trey Hill – guitars, backing vocals 
 Jordan Jameson – guitars
 Grant Norsworthy – bass, backing vocals 
 Chris Kimmerer – drums

Additional musicians
 Ian Fitchuk – keyboards 
 Jeff Pardo – acoustic piano, keyboards, Hammond B3 organ, programming 
 Court Clement – guitars 
 Paul Moak – guitars 
 Mark Polack – bass
 Garrett Buell – percussion 
 George Rowe – backing vocals

Production 
 Rick Heil – executive producer 
 Cece Noland-Heil – executive producer 
 Jeff Pardo – producer, engineer, editing 
 Joel "Tico" Jimenez – engineer 
 Justin Loucks – engineer 
 Ben Phillips – engineer, editing 
 Stan Shilliday – engineer 
 Josh Davis – mixing 
 F. Reid Shippen – mixing 
 Steve Lotz – mix assistant 
 Andrew Mendelson – mastering 
 Jon Allen – photography 
 Jonathan Kingsbury – photography 
 Gladys Lim – photography
 Steve Morrow – photography

References

Sonicflood albums
2006 live albums